Fairmat is a free-of-charge multi-platform software that allows to model financial contracts (e.g. a derivative contract) or projects with many contingencies (e.g. a Real Options model) by decomposing it into basic parts. Complex structures and dependencies are modelled using a graphical interface. Virtually any pay-off function and asset class( from interest rate derivatives to equity-linked notes) can be described using a simple algebraic language.

Fairmat is available for Linux, Microsoft Windows, Mac OS X and Ubuntu.

Features 
 Fairmat provides a high level abstraction and allows users to price and perform analysis for new derivative contracts or project by modelling it with a bottom-up procedure, with no knowledge of programming languages. The generated models can then be solved by using Monte Carlo simulation, binomial trees or closed form procedures (e.g. the black model).
 The information about the structure of every project model is contained in an xml file and can be exchanged with third parties.
 Fairmat capabilities can be extended and specialized by plug-ins using the Mono.addins extensibility model.

Open Source Plug-ins 
The following plug-ins are released under the LGPL license:

Interest rate models 
-The Hull and White one and two factors models.

-The Pelsser squared gaussian model  plug-in.

Equity models 
-The Heston stochastic volatility model plug-in.

-The Dupire local volatility model plug-in.

-The Variance Gamma  model plug-in.

Data Provider integration 

Integration plug-ins for data from the European Central Bank , Yahoo! Finance , and MEFF

Other open source plug-ins 

- Quantum random generator support: the plug-in uses a web service provided by the university of Berlin. For more details see .

Free plug-ins 
Among the other, the following plug-in are free:

- The IAS 39 Hedge Accounting plug-in allows users to generate IAS 39 accounting reports for derivatives .

- The Geometric Brownian Motion plug-in implements the calibration of the Geometric Brownian motion model using different techniques .

Commercial plug-ins 

- The Economic Scenarios Generator plug-in generates market consistent risk-neutral and real-world economic scenarios for 
several asset classes such as zero coupon bonds (ZCB), Inflation Rates, defaultable bonds / credit spreads and baskets of equities and indices

Related services 
From version 1.4 Fairmat supports an on-demand data pricing service offered by the same producers.

Financial software